This is a list of researchers in optofluidics, a research and technology area that combines microfluidics and optics and has applications in displays, biosensors, lab-on-chip devices, lenses, and molecular imaging and energy.

Current research and technologies 
There are numerous research groups worldwide working on optofluidics, including those listed below.

References

Researchers
Research-related lists
Lists of scientists by field